D'Antuono is a surname. Notable people with this name include the following:

Francesca Romana D'Antuono (born 1980s), Italian politician
Michael D'Antuono (born 20th century), American artist

See also